Men's ice hockey tournaments have been staged at the Olympic Games since 1920. The men's tournament was introduced as a demonstration sport at the 1920 Summer Olympics, and made a permanent sport when the Winter Olympics began in 1924. The Polish national team has participated in thirteen tournaments, first in 1928 and most recently in 1992. A total of 18 goaltenders and 136 skaters have represented Poland at the Olympics.

Poland has never finished higher than fourth at the Olympics, which they achieved at the 1932 Winter Olympics, when only four teams participated. Their lowest finish was eleventh, of twelve teams, in 1992. Since 1992, Poland has not participated in the Olympics, though the team has played in Olympic qualifying tournaments.

The Olympic Games were originally intended for amateur athletes, so the players of the National Hockey League (NHL) and other professional leagues were not allowed to compete. The countries that benefited most were the Soviet Bloc countries of Eastern Europe, where top athletes were state-sponsored while retaining their status as amateurs. In 1986, the International Olympic Committee (IOC) voted to allow all athletes to compete in Olympic Games, starting in 1988.

Hilary Skarżyński has scored the most goals, with nine, while Andrzej Fonfara and Andrzej Zabawa have had the most assists, with seven each. Zabawa and Wiesław Jobczyk have each recorded fourteen points, the most of any Polish player. Henryk Gruth and Jerzy Potz have competed in the most Olympics, having taken part in four tournaments, while Gruth has played the most games of any skater, with twenty-four. Władysław Pabisz has won the most games for Poland, with five, while Gabriel Samolej and Józef Stogowski have each played in ten games, the most of any goaltender. Gruth is the only Polish player to be inducted into the International Ice Hockey Federation Hall of Fame.



Key

Goaltenders

Skaters

Notes

References

 
 
 
 
 
 
 
 
 
 

Ice hockey
Poland
Poland